Néstor Mario Montelongo (20 February 1955 – 10 May 2021) was an Uruguayan footballer who played as a right back and striker.

Career
Born in Montevideo, Montelongo played club football for Colón, Montevideo Wanderers, Peñarol, Nacional, Racing and Bella Vista. He began his career as a striker, before being converted to a right back with Wanderers.

He also earned 36 caps for the Uruguay national team between 1979 and 1985, winning the 1983 Copa América.

Personal life
After returning to Uruguay from Argentina he set up a textiles business.

He died on 10 May 2021, aged 66.

References

1955 births
2021 deaths
Uruguayan footballers
Uruguay international footballers
Colón F.C. players
Montevideo Wanderers F.C. players
Peñarol players
Club Nacional de Football players
Racing Club de Avellaneda footballers
C.A. Bella Vista players
Association football fullbacks
Association football forwards
Uruguayan expatriate footballers
Uruguayan expatriates in Argentina
Expatriate footballers in Argentina
Footballers from Montevideo